Inglis is a town in Levy County, Florida, United States. It is on U.S. Highway 19 near the Cross Florida Greenway. As of the 2010 census, the town had a population of 1,325.

Geography 

Demographics

As of the census of 2000, there were 1,491 people in the town, organized into 670 households and 426 families. The racial makeup of the town was 98.73% White, 0.34% Asian, 0.13% Native American, 0.13% from other races, and 0.67% from two or more races. 1.88% of the population were Hispanic or Latino of any race.

There were 670 households, out of which 22.2% had children under the age of 18 living with them, 49.0% were married couples living together; 8.2% had a female householder with no husband present; and 36.3% were non-families. 31.0% of all households were made up of individuals, and 15.2% had someone living alone who was 65 years of age or older. The average household size was 2.23 and the average family size was 2.70.

In the town, the population was spread out, with 20.9% under the age of 18, 5.0% from 18 to 24, 22.3% from 25 to 44, 29.0% from 45 to 64, and 22.8% who were 65 years of age or older. The median age was 46 years. For every 100 females, there were 97.7 males. For every 100 females age 18 and over, there were 102.7 males.

The median income for a household in the town was $24,432, and the median income for a family was $27,734. Males had a median income of $24,342 versus $20,278 for females. The per capita income for the town was $14,098. 22.3% of the population and 18.9% of families were below the poverty line. Out of the total population, 35.1% of those under the age of 18 and 9.6% of those 65 and older were living below the poverty line.

Elvis Presley in Inglis 

During July and August 1961, Elvis Presley spent his summer in Inglis and the surrounding areas filming his movie Follow That Dream. A historical marker on Follow That Dream Parkway in Inglis commemorates this event.

See also

 Inglis quarry

References

External links

Town of Inglis official website

Towns in Levy County, Florida
Towns in Florida